Star Hotel may refer to:

 Star Hotel, Balmain, a pub in Sydney, New South Wales, Australia
 Star Hotel, a pub in Newcastle, New South Wales, Australia, scene of the large Star Hotel riot 
 Star Hotel, Great Yarmouth, Norfolk, England

See also
 For "5-star", "4-star" etc. hotels, see hotel rating.